Claire McCarthy is an Australian screenwriter, director, producer, and visual artist.

Early life
Claire was born in Sydney, the daughter of Christine, an author and concert pianist, and John McCarthy QC.  She graduated with honours from the University of Technology, Sydney with a Bachelor of Design/Communications majoring in film in 1997, and is a Screen Directing (Fiction & Non-Fiction) graduate of the Australian Film, Television and Radio School, 2001.

Career

Directing
Claire McCarthy has been making short films, music videos, documentaries, and feature films since 2007.  Her films have screened at the following international festivals: Toronto International Film Festival, Tunis International Film Festival, Indian Film Festival of Los Angeles, Montreal World Film Festival, New York Film Festival, Pusan International Film Festival, Palm Springs International Film Festival, Flickerfest, St Kilda Film Festival, Sydney Film Festival, and London Film Festival.

Her feature debut, Cross Life (2007), premiered at the Sydney Film Festival (2007) and the Pusan International Film Festival in Korea (2007) and was nominated for an Independent Spirit Award at the 2007 Inside Film Awards.  Cross Life was a low-budget, social realist multi-plot about Sydney's Kings Cross red light district, starring Paul Caesar, Imogen Annesley and Tony Barry.

Her 2008 autobiographical documentary film Sisters was awarded a Young Filmmakers Fund grant, from the New South Wales Film and Television Office.  Sisters is a 52-minute documentary about her journey to India with her teenage sister Helena, to volunteer with the Mother Teresa's religious institute, the Missionaries of Charity, in Calcutta.  Sisters was broadcast on ABC Television in 2008 and 2009, on the Compass program, hosted by Geraldine Doogue.

Building upon relationships she made with fellow volunteers in India, she wrote The Waiting City – a mystic infused drama about a young Australian couple's journey to Calcutta to adopt a baby.  The Waiting City was the first Australian feature-length film to be entirely filmed in India.  The Waiting City, starring Radha Mitchell, Joel Edgerton, Samrat Chakrabarti and Isabel Lucas had its world premiere at the Toronto International Film Festival, as part of the prestigious "Special Presentation" section.  Chakrabarti was named as one of the "Fresh Faces at TIFF" by thestar.com, for his role.  The Waiting City has also screened at the Pusan Film Festival (2009), Indian Film Festival of Los Angeles (2010), the Tunis International Film Festival (2010) and the Sydney Film Festival (2010) and is still travelling the festival circuit. The film was released nationally in Australia on 15 July 2010 and release in other territories will be later in 2010.

In May 2016 it was announced that McCarthy would be directing an adaptation of The Personal History of Rachel DuPree, which would be produced by Viola Davis. In September 2016 it was announced that Davis will also star in the titular role, with Mahershala Ali as her husband and Quvenzhané Wallis as one of her daughters.

Teaching
She has taught screenwriting and filmmaking to masters and undergraduate students at Macquarie University. She has also taught screenwriting to special needs students at North Sydney TAFE.  In the Australian film The Black Balloon she had the role of choreographer to a group of autistic adults who were starring in the film and also contributed to the musical soundtrack as she also did with Sisters and The Waiting City.

Personal life
She is married to award-winning cinematographer Denson Baker ACS.  The couple have collaborated on The Waiting City, The Black Balloon, Skin, and other films, as well as Old Man River's Sunshine music video (set in Varanasi).  Sunshine was nominated for an Australian Cinematographers Society Award in 2008 in the "Best Music Video" category.

She divides her time between Sydney and Los Angeles.

Filmography

References

Sources
 Adam Fulton, The waiting game in a city of spare children, 7 July 2010, Sydney Morning Herald
 TIFF Reviews The Waiting City
 Interview with McCarthy (with ABC’s “At The Movies”)
 “At The Movies” Review

External links 
 Claire McCarthy's Agent (Sydney) RGM Artists
 Claire McCarthy at the Internet Movie Database imdb
 Claire McCarthy Myspace Fan Page myspace
 The Waiting City 
 Australian Film, Television and Radio School AFTRS
 Inside Film Awards

Australian film directors
Australian screenwriters
Australian women film directors
Australian women screenwriters
Year of birth missing (living people)
Living people
University of Technology Sydney alumni